Berezovka is a rural locality (a selo) and the administrative center of Berezovsky Selsoviet of Ivanovsky District, Amur Oblast, Russia. The population was 3,139 as of 2018. There are 32 streets.

Geography 
Berezovka is located 30 km north of Ivanovka (the district's administrative centre) by road. Solnechnoye is the nearest rural locality.

References 

Rural localities in Ivanovsky District, Amur Oblast